The W19, also called Katie, was an American nuclear artillery shell, derived from the earlier W9 shell. The W19 was fired from a special  howitzer. It was introduced in 1955 and retired in 1963.

Specifications
It had a yield of 15-20 kilotons and was like its predecessor the W9, a gun-type nuclear weapon.

Variants

W23
The W19 nuclear system was adapted into a nuclear artillery shell for the US Navy's 16-inch (406 mm) main battery found on the Iowa-class battleships, the W23. Production of the W23 began in 1956 and they were in service until 1962, with a total of 50 units being produced.

As with the W19, yield was 15-20 kilotons.

See also
 Nuclear artillery
 List of nuclear weapons
 W9

External links
 Allbombs.html webpage listing all US nuclear weapons, at nuclearweaponarchive.org

Nuclear warheads of the United States
Gun-type nuclear bombs
Nuclear artillery
Military equipment introduced in the 1950s